Sir John Alexander Sinclair,  (29 May 1897 – 22 March 1977) was a British Army general who was head of the Secret Intelligence Service (SIS) from 1953 to 1956.

Career
Sinclair was the second son of a Church of England priest, John Sinclair. He was educated at West Downs School, Winchester, and the Naval Colleges at Osborne and Dartmouth. He served in the Royal Navy during World War I but had to leave the Navy due to ill health. At the end of the war he transferred to the army and after training at Royal Military Academy, Woolwich, was commissioned into the Royal Field Artillery. In 1938 he was appointed an instructor at the Staff College, Camberley. By 1941 he was Deputy Director of Operations at the War Office and then in 1942 he became Commander Royal Artillery for 1st Division. In 1944 he was appointed Director of Military Intelligence at the War Office. In 1946, while still in the army, he started working for the SIS.

Following his retirement from the military in 1952 as a Major-General, Sinclair was appointed head of the SIS, taking up the post in 1953. He led the Service through the transition from its wartime operations, directing operations in the emerging Cold War environment in a "practical and responsible fashion", "instead of accommodating the risk-takers". He also introduced reforms to recruitment and conditions of service designed to introduce a professional career structure within SIS suited to post-war conditions. His personal integrity was recognised not just by colleagues, but also by opponents.

Sir John's retirement coincided with a failed frogman mission to investigate the  Ordzhonikidze that had brought the leader of the Soviet Union, Nikita Khrushchev, and Prime Minister Nikolai Bulganin on a diplomatic mission to Britain, resulting in the death of frogman Lionel Crabb. The Prime Minister had not approved this mission and some accounts incorrectly claimed that Sir John had been forced to resign. The "Authorized History of MI5" confirms that the decision that the head of that service should succeed Sir John at his planned retirement date in 1956 had been taken by the Prime Minister in 1954.

References

SINCLAIR, Maj.-Gen. Sir John, Who Was Who, A & C Black, 1920–2016 (online edition, Oxford University Press, 2014)

Bibliography

External links

Generals of World War II

|-

1897 births
1977 deaths
Graduates of Britannia Royal Naval College
People educated at West Downs School
Royal Navy personnel of World War I
Graduates of the Royal Military Academy, Woolwich
Royal Artillery officers
British Army generals of World War II
War Office personnel in World War II
Cold War MI6 chiefs
Graduates of the Staff College, Camberley
Knights Commander of the Order of St Michael and St George
Companions of the Order of the Bath
Officers of the Order of the British Empire
People educated at the Royal Naval College, Osborne
Foreign recipients of the Legion of Merit
Commanders of the Order of the Crown (Belgium)
British Army major generals
Military personnel from London
Academics of the Staff College, Camberley